Hyposmocoma punctifumella is a species of moth of the family Cosmopterigidae. It was first described by Lord Walsingham in 1907. It is endemic to the Hawaiian island of Maui.

External links

punctifumella
Endemic moths of Hawaii